Bicameralism may refer to:
Bicameralism, a form of legislature
Bicameral mentality, a theory about the development of the human brain
For bicameral script, see Letter case